Odo II, Count of Porhoet (died after 1180) was the son of Geoffroy, Viscount de Porhoët, and his wife Hawise (possibly Fergant). He became Duke of Brittany in 1148, jure uxoris,  upon his marriage to Bertha, Duchess of Brittany.

On Bertha's death, Odo II denied her son Conan IV of Penthièvre, Duke of Brittany his inheritance. While Odo II's marriage to Bertha was his first, it was her second marriage, her first being to Alain 'le Noir' de Penthièvre, Lord of Richmond (Alan, 1st Earl of Richmond). Odo II allied with his brother-in-law, Hoèl, Count of Nantes. Odo II was deposed by his stepson Conan IV in 1156, and taken prisoner by Conan IV's ally Raoul de Fougères.

He married secondly, in 1167, a daughter of Guihomar IV, Viscount of Léon and his wife Nobilis, sometimes identitifed by the names Eleanor or Joan by later authors

Issue 
Odo II had two children by Bertha:
 Geoffrey de Porhoët
 Adelaide (or Alix) of Porhoët (d. 1220). She was sent to Henry II of England's court as an hostage and was alleged by his enemies to have become his mistress. This accusation remains unclear. She later becoming Abbess of Fontevrault.

Odo and his second wife had two children
 Odo III of Porhoët (died 1231). He was married, but the name of his wife is not known.
 Harvey or Henry of Porhoët
 Eleanor of Porhoët, wife of Conan of Penthièvre, de La Roche-Derrien, son of Henry of Penthièvre, Count of Tréguier and Guingamp, and Mathilde de Vendôme.
 maybe Alice of Porhoët, who married into the Mauvoisin family

Notes

References

Sources

 

1180 deaths
12th-century dukes of Brittany
Dukes of Brittany
House of Rohan
Year of birth unknown
Jure uxoris officeholders
Porhoët family